The Novaer U-Xc Stardream is a proposed four passenger, composite aircraft.

Design and development
The U-Xc Stardream was first proposed by Novaer Craft in 2010. The aircraft will use carbon fiber main and secondary structures with a fiberglass cowling. The aircraft will be equipped with a ballistic parachute. Testing is planned for the end of 2012, with production planned for 2015.

Variants
T-Xc Pilgrim
Two seat military trainer variant, stressed for +6/-3g

Specifications

See also

References

Proposed aircraft
Proposed aircraft of Brazil
Low-wing aircraft
Single-engined tractor aircraft